Ambia Tohva  is a village in the Jalandhar district, near the town of Kartarpur, in Punjab, India.

Villages in Jalandhar district